Esa Ruoho (born 26 October 1978 in Helsinki, Finland), better known as Lackluster, is a Finnish electronic music producer and performer from Kontula, Helsinki. He is also known as Esa Ruoho, XLLV, Can'O'Lard and Kökö and the Köks.

Ruoho has lived most of his life in Helsinki, Finland, but has also, since 2000, travelled to Regina, Saskatchewan, Canada for six months in 2000–2001, and also spent time in Dublin, Ireland.

Musical career 
Esa Ruoho started composing electronic music in the mid-1990s and, after 2000 has been releasing recorded music (remixes, compilation-tracks, original work) on  many labels, full-length CDs on such labels as deFocus records (Great Britain), Merck Records (Miami, Florida, US), U-cover (Belgium), Psychonavigation Records (Dublin, Ireland), New-Speak Records (Stockholm, Sweden). He has since 2007 worked with SLSK Records from San Francisco and Nice And Nasty from Ireland, the San Francisco-based netlabel TwoCircles Records and the Argentinian netlabel Igloo-Rec, and the American label JellyFish Frequency Recordings.

Lackluster was formerly known as the chiptune musician, Distance, part of the demoscene groups Orange, Monotonik, Calodox, The Digital Artists, The Planet of Leather Moomins (TPOLM), FLO and Satori.

Esa also ran a Bulletin Board System, Cloudcity, from 1992 to 2000 – utilizing HectoBBS (1992), SuperBBS (1992–1994) and PCBoard (1994–2000) BBS Software. The name Lackluster is taken from "Pyramids" by Terry Pratchett (Discworld series), encountered 1996–1997.

Collaborations

Esa has collaborated with Heikki Lindgren since 2018, forming a duo called HLER (Heikki Lindgren, Esa Ruoho), creating fully improvised Ambient Drone music using a rare Peruvian monophonic synthesizer, the Atomosynth Mochika XL.

Live performances
Since 2000, Ruoho has played numerous musical performances as Lackluster, Esa Ruoho and as a part of the ambient-drone duo HLER in Finland, Sweden, Norway, Netherlands, Belgium, Italy, Germany, France, Spain, Ireland, England, Austria, Poland, Russia, Latvia, Estonia, Bulgaria, Hungary, Lithuania and Ukraine.
Ruoho has also played as warm-up support for numerous electronic musicians, such as Biosphere, Petri Kuljuntausta, The Orb, Mixmaster Morris, Brothomstates, Aleksi Perälä/Astrobotnia/Ovuca, Cylob, Wevie Stonder, Machinedrum, Jimmy Edgar, Move D, Jimi Tenor and Bad Loop.

Discography
 1999 – Album – "CDR#2" (CDr) Monotonik
 2000 – EP – "FOC349" (LP) deFocus
 2000 – Album – "Container" (CD, LP) deFocus
 2000 – EP – "R U Oho?" (LP) deFocus
 2000 – EP – "Rikos005" (LP) Rikos Records
 2001 – Album – "Spaces" (CD) U-Cover (as Esa Ruoho)
 2001 – EP – "Spaces" (LP) Inc.US (as Esa Ruoho)
 2001 – EP – "Zealectronic Purple" (LP) Zeal
 2001 – EP – "One-Offs" (NET) Monotonik
 2002 – EP – "A Lackluster Sampler" (LP) Merck
 2002 – EP – "Wrapping Album Sampler" (LP) deFocus
 2002 – Album – "Wrapping" (CD, LP) deFocus
 2003 – Album – "Showcase" (CD) Merck
 2003 – EP – "None of That" (NET) Binkcrsh (as Can'O'Lard)
 2003 – LP – "None of What" (NET) Corewatch (as Can'O'Lard)
 2003 – EP – "Not An EP" (NET) Corewatch
 2003 – EP – "You Are on My Mind" (NET) Monotonik
 2004 – EP – "Showcase Sampler" (LP) Merck
 2004 – Album – "Remixselection_one" (CD) Psychonavigation
 2004 – EP – "R U Oho?" (LP) Merck
 2005 – Album – "Slice" (CD) U-Cover
 2005 – Album – "What You Want Isn't What You Need" (CD) Newspeak Records
 2006 – EP – "Lax EP" (NET) Digilog
 2007 – EP – "Repulsine EP" (CD) SLSK Records
 2007 – EP – "The Stationary Trout" (NET) Part2 Records
 2008 – Album – "Places" (CDr) Grundruck Records (as Esa Ruoho)
 2009 – EP – "Aeration" (NET) TwoCircles Records
 2009 – EP – "Cold Trail" (NET) Acroplane Recordings
 2009 – EP – "Proof of Concept" (NET) Yuki Yaki Recordings
 2009 – EP – "The Flows" (NET) Part2 Records
 2009 – EP – "Portal" (NET) Cornwarning
 2009 – EP – "Scattered Harvest" (NET) Format-Noise
 2011 – EP – "Remixed" (DIGITAL) Nice & Nasty Records
 2011 – EP – "Detro" (DIGITAL) Nice & Nasty Records
 2011 – EP – "Kaneel/Lackluster Split 3"" (CDr) Awkward Silence recordings
 2011 – Album – "The Invisible Spanish Inquisition" (CD) Igloo Pop Records
 2011 – EP – "Riversmouth" (3" CD-r) Attenuation Circuit
 2012 – Album – "On The Hangar of Spaceship Earth" (NET) Mahorka Net-Label (as Esa Ruoho)
 2014 – Album – "Moments" (DIGITAL) Igloo Pop Records
 2014 – Album – "Lexicon of Goods" (DIGITAL) JellyFish Frequency Recordings
 2015 – Album – "Merck Package" (DIGITAL) Lackluster Bandcamp
 2015 – EP – "Parched Throat" (CD-r/DIGITAL) Attenuation Circuit (as Esa Ruoho)
 2015 – EP – "Swansong" (NET) Kahvi Collective
 2015 – Album – "deFocus Package" (NET) Lackluster Bandcamp
 2015 – Album – "PSCHNVGTN K T H X" (NET) Lackluster Bandcamp
 2016 – Album – "Moonbears on Planet Earth Soundtrack" (NET) Lackluster Bandcamp
 2016 – Album – Esa Ruoho: KVA-015 (Cassette) Kaukana Väijyy Ambient (as Esa Ruoho)
 2018 – Album – HLER (Cassette) HLER Bandcamp (Heikki Lindgren & Esa Ruoho = HLER)
 2018 – EP – Yep, I'd Certainly take a Roland D2 for free (NET) Lackluster Bandcamp
 2018 – Album – "Hydroton - a model of Cold Fusion: Original Soundtrack" (NET) Lackluster Bandcamp
 2018 – Album – Collage (NET) Lackluster Bandcamp (as Esa Ruoho)
 2019 – Album – Avaruusromua Special 2016 (NET) Lackluster Bandcamp (as Esa Ruoho)
 2021 - EP - 100606 Kosmos8 Sinuus Sina

Media collaborations
Utopias of Helsinki, a web report for Helsingin Sanomat "What would Helsinki be like now, if all of the grandiose city-utopias of the 1960s had come to fruition?" (composition)(2001)
Pauli Ojala (a Finnish graphics artist) on "13/10/99", a short music video which was presented at the Assembly 2001 Wild demo competition, placing 4th.
Wilma Mehtonen (a Finnish choreographer) "Ulottumaton Symbioosi" (2002).
Halcyon (demogroup) DVD, providing in-menu composition (2002)
Wilma Mehtonen "T.43" modern dance-performance (2003).
Teemu Niskanen (a Finnish photographer) on a web-slideshow project (2006).
Thuyen Nguyen: "The Most Powerful Person in the World" – 16 May 2007.
Synopsis: A love letter to video games.
Luca Barbeni (designer) on "dune.8081", a flash website, 2007.
Mari Helisevä (painter) on "Luontaisenkaltaisia", an art installation featuring a musical mixture of kitchen-recorded materials, displayed at Maa-Tila, Helsinki, Finland, from 9 to 20 January 2008.
Thuyen Nguyen: "Same as it ever was" – 29 February 2008. 
Synopsis: Video game critics use the same arguments against gaming as they did for movies, television, comics, books.
 Jonatan Söderström: Retro 4, 2008 
scheltema/van beem NEPCO/ILC: "Headfooters", 2008 
Synopsis: Cutesy headfoot monsters jump around to the sound of "Hugytrak" off of Lackluster: Slice (released on U-Cover)
Antti Mutta/Pelaaja-Lehti (Journalist) on "Korg DS-10", a review, Pelaaja-Lehti September/2009 (2009)
 Toisissa Tiloissa: "Suuri Koralliriutta" – 21 April 2018, 29 September 2018.
Synopsis: An improvised dance performance open to the public organised by Toisissa Tiloissa and Kontula Electronic, held at the Youth House of Kontula - re-run at Kanneltalo.

References

External links

 Lackluster on Bandcamp
 
 
 Lackluster at Last.fm

1978 births
Living people
Ableton Live users
Demosceners
Finnish electronic musicians
Jeskola Buzz users
Renoise users
Ambient musicians